Guillermo García-López and Philipp Oswald were the defending champions, but García-López chose not to participate this year.  Oswald played alongside Martin Kližan, but they lost in the first round to Carlos Berlocq and Leonardo Mayer.
Juan Sebastián Cabal and Robert Farah won the title, defeating Paolo Lorenzi and Diego Schwartzman in the final, 6–4, 6–2.

Seeds

Draw

Draw

References
 Main Draw

Brasil Open - Doubles
2015 Brasil Open